José María Fenollera e Ibáñez (10 December 1851 – 6 December 1918) was a Spanish painter, known primarily for portraits.

Life 
He studied at the Real Academia de Bellas Artes de San Carlos. After that, he travelled to Paris, where he learned the techniques of photoengraving. He eventually settled in Madrid, where he created designs for the Royal Tapestry Factory and decorated the popular . 

In 1887, he moved to Santiago de Compostela, where he established himself as a Professor at the School of Fine Arts and became involved in the Galician regionalist movement. He was primarily devoted to painting portraits of Galician notables; such as the writer, Eugenio Montero Ríos, José Carvajal y Hué and Cardinal . He also did a series on the Presidents of the Sociedad Económica de los Amigos del País. Later, he created frescoes at the Universidad de Santiago de Compostela.

In 1890, he married Consuelo Velón y González-Pardo, a member of the Galician nobility. 

References

Further reading 
Alfonso Fernández-Cid Fenollera, Fenollera: Pintor Gallego por amor, Consorcio De Santiago, 2008

External links 

"José María Fenollera: un artista perturbador e iconoclasta" by Jorge Fernández-Cid

1851 births
1918 deaths
Spanish painters
Painters from Galicia (Spain)
Spanish portrait painters
People from Valencia